Parvis Notre-Dame – Place Jean-Paul II is a city square in Paris, France. Located in the city's 4th arrondissement on the eastern half of the Île de la Cité, the square is bordered by the Hôtel-Dieu hospital to the north, the cathedral of Notre-Dame to the east, the Seine River to the south, and the Prefecture of Police headquarters to the west. The square contains France's point zéro marker, making it the very center of Paris for the purpose of measuring travel distance.

Name 

Historically the square has been called Place du Parvis Notre-Dame, or shortened to Place du Parvis or Parvis Notre-Dame. This is due to its historic function as the parvis of Notre-Dame de Paris.

After the death of Pope John Paul II in 2005, it was proposed to rename the square "Place Jean-Paul II." The name was intended to memorialize the late pope's visit to the square in 1980, as well as his subsequent visit to Notre-Dame in 1997 for World Youth Day. The proposal was controversial, however, eventually resulting in the square's current compound name in 2006.

History 

The surface of the current square sits about four to five meters above the ancient ground level. Likewise the ancient bank of the river was almost at the center of the current square; it has since moved about 50 meters to the south. Many different buildings were constructed over the years, including a Roman defensive wall and Saint Etienne de Paris, an early medieval church. The remains of many of these buildings can now be seen in the Archaeological Crypt underneath the square.

The parvis was first mentioned in 1160, just before the construction of Notre-Dame began. During the Middle Ages, the square was only about 1,000 square meters, roughly one tenth of its current size. During the Middle Ages, convicted criminals were often taken to the parvis before their executions to make public confession. The parvis was not used as a place of execution, however, until the Reformation, and even then this was reserved for those convicted of religious crimes. Examples of this include Jacques Belon in 1548 and Jean Thuret in 1550, both of whom attacked a statue of the Virgin inside Notre-Dame, and François Sarazin in 1670 who murdered a priest inside Notre-Dame.

The first major expansion took place in the early 18th century when the church and hospital of Saint-Christophe were demolished. The size of the square was doubled and a fountain was added on the western side. Drawings made at the time show that a short wall was built around the western and northern sides of the square to control traffic. A short series of steps led down into the parvis, which was about half a meter below the surrounding streets.

The first archaeological digs in the parvis were done in the eastern side of the square in 1842. Workers at that time discovered the original western steps of Notre-Dame which had been covered over by centuries of repaving. Jean-Baptiste Lassus and Eugène Viollet-le-Duc referenced this recent discovery in their written proposal to restore Notre-Dame in 1843. Later in 1847, Lassus and Viollet-le-Duc oversaw further excavations in the parvis, during which the foundations of the Roman wall and Saint-Etienne were found.

During the 1853 to 1870 renovation of Paris by Baron Haussmann, many buildings on the Île de la Cité were demolished, including all the buildings between the rue de la Cité and the rue d'Arcole. Between 1867 and 1878, the current Hôtel-Dieu building to the north of the square was built, and the hospital's old building to the south was demolished, at which point the parvis took on its current size and shape. The expansion of the parvis was intended to better display Notre-Dame's architecture. Although the change was not without its drawbacks, as American authors Richard and Clara Winston noted "Something has been gained, something lost, by the creation of the vast open square in front. Distance diminishes size but provides a greater sense of the graciousness of the whole."

For about 100 years from the renovation of Baron Haussmann until the 1960s, the parvis was a major traffic thoroughfare, including a double tram line. The north and south sides of the square have remained largely unchanged since this time, besides the landscaping. On the north side is a wide walking path lined with horse chestnut trees. On the south side is a green space along the river planted with horse chestnut and plane trees. A promenade was built along the river, which has since been named for Belgian poet Maurice Carême.

The statue Charlemagne et ses Leudes was installed in 1882 on the southside of the square. The statue's current pedestal dates to 1908.

The point zéro medallion was installed in 1924. The marker was used as a starting point for measuring distance on the National Route system. It was temporarily removed in 1966, and the same medallion replaced in 1972. The usage of the parvis for measuring travel distance is a tradition originating in the Middle Ages by pilgrims travelling to Notre-Dame.

In 1965, excavation work began in the square to build an underground parking garage. In the process, ancient foundations were discovered going back to Roman times. The original plan for the garage was reduced to the west, while the ruins were rooved over by the parvis surface. The site was opened to visitors in 1980. The crypt is managed by the Musée Carnavalet, and contains a large exhibit, detailed models of the architecture of different time periods, and how they can be viewed within the ruins. The main feature still visible is the under-floor heating installed during the Roman period.

In 1972, the square received much of its current appearance. To make the space more pedestrian-friendly, vehicle traffic was diverted to a one-way street on the west and north of the square, while regular vehicle traffic from the Pont au Double was closed off. The square was repaved with its current paving stones which show the locations of some of the historical structures which once stood on the parvis. Benches and raised shrubbery beds were also added.

On 30 May 1980, Pope John Paul II celebrated Mass in Notre-Dame and also made an appearance on the parvis. It was the pope's first official visit to France and the first visit of any pope to France since 1814. The square was given its current name in 2006, after the death of the pope.

In 2017, an Algerian student attacked a police officer on the parvis resulting in a two-hour lockdown.

Since the 2019 Notre-Dame de Paris fire, the eastern half of the parvis has been closed off and used as a working space by the restoration team.

Gallery

See also 
 Squares in Paris

References

Squares in Paris
Buildings and structures in the 4th arrondissement of Paris
Île de la Cité
Kilometre-zero markers